The 1937 Hastings by-election was held on 24 November 1937.  The by-election was held due to the resignation of the incumbent Conservative MP, Eustace Percy.  It was won by the Conservative candidate Maurice Hely-Hutchinson.

References

1937 elections in the United Kingdom
1937 in England
20th century in Sussex
Hastings
By-elections to the Parliament of the United Kingdom in East Sussex constituencies